A list of films produced in Argentina in 1967:

External links and references
 Argentine films of 1967 at the Internet Movie Database

1967
Films
Argentine